Dominic Rashad McGuire (born October 20, 1985) is an American professional basketball player for Real Estelí Baloncesto.

High school career
McGuire played high school prep basketball at Lincoln High School in San Diego.

College career
After high school, McGuire subsequently attended the University of California, Berkeley, where he played college basketball with the  Cal Golden Bears. He transferred to California State University, Fresno to play with the Fresno State Bulldogs, after his sophomore year of college, when he was the fourth-leading scorer for the Cal Golden Bears the during the 2004–05 season.

Professional career

Washington Wizards (2007–2010)

McGuire was selected in the second round (47th overall) of the 2007 NBA Draft out of Fresno State by the Washington Wizards. On August 13, 2007, McGuire signed a 3-year deal with the Washington Wizards. On April 16, 2008, McGuire got his first start in his NBA career, against the Orlando Magic.

Sacramento Kings (2010)
On February 18, 2010, he was traded to the Sacramento Kings for a protected 2010 2nd round draft pick.

Charlotte Bobcats (2010–2011)
On July 22, 2010, he signed with the Charlotte Bobcats. On February 24, 2011, McGuire was waived by the Bobcats following a trade between the Bobcats and Portland Trail Blazers. However, he was re-signed on March 3, 2011.

Golden State Warriors (2011–2012)
On December 15, 2011, McGuire signed with the Golden State Warriors.

Toronto Raptors (2012)
On September 12, 2012, he signed with the Toronto Raptors. He was waived on November 30, 2012, when the team signed Mickael Pietrus.

New Orleans Hornets (2012–2013)
On December 16, 2012, McGuire signed with the New Orleans Hornets. He was waived by the Hornets on January 4, 2013.

Indiana Pacers (2013)
On January 7, 2013, McGuire signed with the Indiana Pacers on a 10-day contract. He was signed to another 10-day contract on January 17, 2013.

Utah Jazz (2013)
On September 26, 2013, he signed with the Utah Jazz. He was later waived by the Jazz on October 26.

Santa Cruz Warriors (2014)
In January 2014, he was acquired by the NBA D-League's Santa Cruz Warriors. In March 2014, he was traded to the NBA D-League's Tulsa 66ers.

Gigantes de Guayana (2014)
In April 2014, he signed with Gigantes de Guayana of Venezuela for the rest of the 2014 LPB season.

Hapoel Eilat (2014)
On August 27, 2014, he signed to play in Israel with Hapoel Eilat of the Israeli Basketball Premier League.

Hapoel Holon (2014–2015)
On November 6, 2014, he left Eilat and signed with another Israeli club, Hapoel Holon for the rest of the season.

Shenzhen Leopards (2015–2016)
In August 2015, McGuire signed with the Shenzhen Leopards of China for the 2015–16 CBA season.

Leones de Ponce (2016)
On February 26, 2016, he signed with the Leones de Ponce of Puerto Rico for the 2016 BSN season. On April 14, 2016, he parted ways with Leones de Ponce.

Club Malvín (2018)
On April 19, 2018, McGuire was reported to have signed with Club Malvín of the Liga Uruguaya de Basketball.

Aguacateros de Michoacán (2018–present)
In December 2018, McGuire joined Mexican team Aguacateros de Michoacán of the Liga Nacional de Baloncesto Profesional.

NBA career statistics

Regular season

|-
| align="left" | 
| align="left" | Washington
| 70 || 1 || 9.9 || .379 || .167 || .438 || 2.0 || .6 || .3 || .4 || 1.3
|-
| align="left" | 
| align="left" | Washington
| 79 || 57 || 26.2 || .432 || .500 || .725 || 5.4 || 2.5 || .8 || .9 || 4.5
|-
| align="left" | 
| align="left" | Washington
| 41 || 0 || 5.9 || .375 || .000 || .000 || 1.5 || .2 || .1 || .1 || .7
|-
| align="left" | 
| align="left" | Sacramento
| 10 || 2 || 6.7 || .333 || .000 || .000 || 1.8 || .3 || .1 || .1 || .8
|-
| align="left" | 
| align="left" | Charlotte
| 52 || 8 || 14.6 || .396 || .000 || .769 || 3.8 || .8 || .2 || .6 || 3.3
|-
| align="left" | 
| align="left" | Golden State
| 64 || 6 || 17.6 || .448 || .000 || .736 || 3.8 || 1.7 || .7 || .6 || 3.5
|-
| align="left" | 
| align="left" | Toronto
| 15 || 9 || 15.3 || .469 || .000 || .333 || 3.2 || .7 || .3 || .5 || 2.1
|-
| align="left" | 
| align="left" | New Orleans
| 9 || 0 || 16.1 || .429 || .000 || .500 || 3.1 || 1.0 || .9 || .3 || 2.1
|-
| align="left" | 
| align="left" | Indiana
| 2 || 1 || 6.0 || .000 || .000 || .000 || 1.0 || .5 || .0 || .0 || .0
|- class="sortbottom"
| style="text-align:center;" colspan="2"| Career
| 342 || 84 || 15.6 || .419 || .188 || .658 || 3.4 || 1.2 || .5 || .5 || 2.7

Playoffs

|-
| align="left" | 2008
| align="left" | Washington
| 3 || 0 || 5.0 || .000 || .000 || .500 || 1.0 || .3 || .3 || .3 || .3
|- class="sortbottom"
| style="text-align:center;" colspan="2"| Career
| 3 || 0 || 5.0 || .000 || .000 || .500 || 1.0 || .3 || .3 || .3 || .3

Career highs
Points: 16 @ Philadelphia 01/30/09
Rebounds: 17 @ Atlanta 12/17/10
Assists: 9 vs. Atlanta 03/02/09
Steals: 4 vs. Phoenix 01/26/09
Blocks: 4 3 times

References

External links
Career statistics and player information from NBA.com 
Eurobasket profile

1985 births
Living people
African-American basketball players
American expatriate basketball people in Canada
American expatriate basketball people in China
American expatriate basketball people in Israel
American expatriate basketball people in Mexico
American expatriate basketball people in Nicaragua
American expatriate basketball people in Uruguay
American expatriate basketball people in Venezuela
American men's basketball players
Basketball players from San Diego
Big3 players
California Golden Bears men's basketball players
Charlotte Bobcats players
Club Malvín basketball players
Fresno State Bulldogs men's basketball players
Golden State Warriors players
Hapoel Eilat basketball players
Hapoel Holon players
Leones de Ponce basketball players
Power forwards (basketball)
Real Estelí Baloncesto players
Sacramento Kings players
Santa Cruz Warriors players
Shenzhen Leopards players
Small forwards
Toronto Raptors players
Washington Wizards draft picks
Washington Wizards players
21st-century African-American sportspeople
20th-century African-American people
American men's 3x3 basketball players